Frank Morris Ridley Jr. (May 1, 1883 – January 28, 1953) was an American college football player and physician.

College football
Ridley was a prominent member of the Georgia Bulldogs football teams of the University of Georgia, captain of the team in 1901 and 1902.

1901
At year's end, Ridley was re-elected captain. He was then the youngest ever captain and the only to be elected such twice.

1902
After the scoreless tie with Georgia Tech, Ridley "was somewhat disgusted and declared that it was the worst game the Georgia team had ever played." Ridley was selected an All-Southern lineman along with teammates Harold Ketron and Sandy Beaver, achieving the honor in his first year at the position – moved to end from the backfield. One account of Ridley reads "Ridley's first year on the team he played this position so well that Coach Heisman named his as the All-Southern end. He is quick and active and never hesitates to tackle a man, seldom being blocked."

Physician
In 1906 he graduated with honors from the old Atlanta College of Physicians and Surgeons. He specialized as a surgeon and diagnostician.

Marriage
On June 6, 1906, Ridley married Sister Mabel Douglas Hood.

Shot
Ridley was once shot at the wedding of his cousin in 1907, nearly dying.

References

1883 births
1953 deaths
20th-century surgeons
American football ends
American surgeons
Georgia Bulldogs football players
All-Southern college football players
People from Troup County, Georgia
Players of American football from Georgia (U.S. state)